Marten von Barnekow (18 March 1900 in Bromberg – 29 January 1967 in Rehau) was a German equestrian and Olympic champion. He won a gold medal in show jumping with the German team at the 1936 Summer Olympics in Berlin.

References

1900 births
1967 deaths
Sportspeople from Bydgoszcz
German male equestrians
Olympic equestrians of Germany
Olympic gold medalists for Germany
Equestrians at the 1936 Summer Olympics
Olympic medalists in equestrian
Medalists at the 1936 Summer Olympics